The Oradell Public School District is a community public school district that serves students in kindergarten through sixth grade from Oradell, in Bergen County, New Jersey, United States. The district consists of a single school, Oradell Public School.

As of the 2019–20 school year, the district, comprised of one school, had an enrollment of 768 students and 64.2 classroom teachers (on an FTE basis), for a student–teacher ratio of 12.0:1.

The district is classified by the New Jersey Department of Education as being in District Factor Group "I", the second-highest of eight groupings. District Factor Groups organize districts statewide to allow comparison by common socioeconomic characteristics of the local districts. From lowest socioeconomic status to highest, the categories are A, B, CD, DE, FG, GH, I and J.

Oradell and neighboring River Edge share a combined school district for seventh through twelfth grades, River Dell Regional School District, which was established in 1958. Schools in the district (with 2019–20 enrollment data from the National Center for Education Statistics) are 
River Dell Regional Middle School in River Edge with 541 students in grades 7-8 and 
River Dell Regional High School in Oradell with 1,062 students in grades 9-12.

School
Oradell Public School served an enrollment of 758 students as of the 2019–20 school year.
Michelle Hawley, Principal

Administration
The members of the district's administration are:
Megan N. Bozios, Superintendent
John M. Marmora, Business Administrator / Board Secretary

Board of education
The district's board of education, comprised of nine members, sets policy and oversees the fiscal and educational operation of the district through its administration. As a Type II school district, the board's trustees are elected directly by voters to serve three-year terms of office on a staggered basis, with three seats up for election each year held (since 2012) as part of the November general election. The board appoints a superintendent to oversee the district's day-to-day operations and a business administrator to supervise the business functions of the district.

References

External links
Oradell Public School District website

School Data for the Oradell Public School District, National Center for Education Statistics
River Dell Regional School District 
River Dell Regional High School

Oradell, New Jersey
New Jersey District Factor Group I
School districts in Bergen County, New Jersey